2008–09 Serie A was the 67th Serie A season in the history of Società Sportiva Calcio Napoli, and their 83rd overall.

Squad

Matches

UEFA Intertoto Cup

Pre-season friendlies

Serie A

UEFA Cup

2nd qualifying round

First round

Transfers

In

Out

Players out on loan

Squad statistics

Appearances and goals
Last updated on 30 May 2009

|}

Disciplinary record
 Disciplinary records for 2008–09 league and cup matches. Players with 1 card or more included only.

Starting 11

External links
 Official website

S.S.C. Napoli seasons
Napoli